GoCar  may refer to:

 GoCar (carsharing), a carsharing program in Ireland
 GoCar Tours, a GPS guided rental scooter (motorcycle) tour company found in several countries

See also 

 Go cart